Zemacies excelsa is a species of sea snail, a marine gastropod mollusk in the family Borsoniidae.

Description
The shell grows to a length of 55 mm. Individuals can grow to 58.2mm and can have a wet body mass of 24.5g. Dead Zemacies excelsa form shallow marine sediments.

Distribution
This species occurs in the Pacific Ocean off New Caledonia and New Zealand.

References

 Sysoev, A. & Bouchet, P., 2001. New and uncommon turriform gastropods (Gastropoda: Conoidea) from the south-west Pacific. Mémoires du Muséum national d'Histoire naturelle 185: 271–320

External links
 
 MNHN, Paris: Zemacies excelsa (holotype)

excelsa
Gastropods described in 2001
Molluscs of the Pacific Ocean